Joo Young-hoon (born November 6, 1969) is a South Korean singer, songwriter, and television personality. He began his career as a songwriter in the 1990s, composing hit songs for artists including Uhm Jung-hwa and Turbo. He debuted as a singer in 1997 with the album Ballad, which he followed with Nostalgia in 2000, and Love Concerto in 2001.

Discography

Studio albums

Filmography

TV Drama

Television shows

Personal life
Joo married actress Lee Yoon-mi on October 28, 2006. They have two daughters – Joo Ara, who was born on March 24, 2010, and Joo Ra-el, who was born on August 4, 2015.

References

External links
 

1969 births
Living people
South Korean male singers
South Korean singer-songwriters
South Korean record producers
South Korean composers
South Korean television presenters
Kyunggi High School alumni
South Korean male singer-songwriters